Montgomery Street is a north-south thoroughfare in San Francisco, California, in the United States.

It runs about 16 blocks from the Telegraph Hill neighborhood south through downtown, terminating at Market Street. South of Columbus Avenue, Montgomery Street runs through the heart of San Francisco's Financial District and contains one of the highest concentrations of financial activity, investment business, and venture capital in the United States and the world. For this reason, it is known as "the Wall Street of the West".  South of Market Street, the street continues as New Montgomery Street for two more blocks to terminate at Howard Street in the SOMA district.

History

In the 1830s, the land which is now Montgomery Street lay at the edge of San Francisco Bay. Intense land speculation during the Gold Rush created a demand for more usable land in the rapidly growing city, and sandy bluffs near the waterfront were leveled and the shallows filled with sand (and the ruins of many ships) to make new building lots. Between 1849 and 1852, the waterfront advanced about four blocks. At present, Montgomery Street is about seven blocks from the water.

The corner of Montgomery and Clay is where John B. Montgomery landed when he came to hoist the U.S. flag after the Bear Flag Revolt of 1846. In 1853 the Montgomery Block, a center of early San Francisco law and literature, was built at 600 Montgomery, on land currently occupied by the Transamerica Pyramid.

Offices

Many banks and financial-services companies have had offices in the buildings on or near Montgomery Street, especially between Market Street and Sacramento Street:
 The world headquarters of Wells Fargo are at 420 Montgomery.
 555 California Street, between Kearny and Montgomery, served as Bank of America's world headquarters prior to its merger with NationsBank and was (from 1969 to 2005) officially called the Bank of America Building.
 The Transamerica Pyramid (600 Montgomery, at Columbus Avenue) was the headquarters of Transamerica Corporation and still appears in the company's logo.
 Melvin Belli, lawyer known as "The King of Torts", had his offices at the Belli Building at 722-724 Montgomery St. Belli used to raise a Jolly Roger and fire a cannon every time he won a case.
 Bank of the West is headquartered at 180 Montgomery Street.
 , at 130 Montgomery Street.

High-rises
Notable high-rises and skyscrapers along Montgomery Street in the Financial District:

44 Montgomery
Hunter-Dulin Building (111 Sutter at Montgomery)
100 Montgomery Street
101 Montgomery
180 Montgomery Street
Russ Building (235 Montgomery)
Commercial Union Assurance Building (315 Montgomery)
456 Montgomery Plaza
505 Montgomery Street
Transamerica Pyramid (600 Montgomery)
A building bearing the name of One Montgomery Tower is located at the intersection of Post and Kearny streets, behind the Wells Fargo flagship branch and Crocker Galleria.

Public transit
Montgomery Street is served by the BART and Muni Metro Montgomery Street Station.

References

Financial districts in the United States
Streets in San Francisco
Economy of San Francisco
Financial District, San Francisco
Chinatown, San Francisco